Robinne Lee (born July 16, 1974) is an American actress and author. She made her screen debut in the 1997 independent film Hav Plenty, and later has appeared in films National Security (2003), Deliver Us from Eva (2003), Hitch (2005), Seven Pounds (2008), Fifty Shades Darker (2017), and Fifty Shades Freed (2018).

Life and career
Lee was born in Mount Vernon, New York on July 16. A graduate of Yale University and Columbia Law School, Lee began her acting career as part of the ensemble cast of the romantic comedy Hav Plenty in 1997, which was shown at Toronto Film Festival. She spent the following years working in smaller films, and well as co-starred in television movies include The Runaway opposite Debbi Morgan. On television, Lee also guest-starred on Buffy the Vampire Slayer, and Numbers. She also appeared in R&B singer Usher's music video for his 2004 single "Confessions Part II".

In 2003, Lee appeared in two films, action comedy National Security, with Martin Lawrence and Steve Zahn, and opposite LL Cool J and Gabrielle Union in the romantic comedy Deliver Us from Eva. In 2005, Lee had a role in box-office hit Hitch, starring Will Smith. In 2008, she co-starred again with Smith in the drama film Seven Pounds playing his character's fiancee. As lead actress, she starred in the 2008 comedy-drama This Is Not a Test. In 2009, Lee co-starred alongside Don Cheadle in the comedy film Hotel for Dogs.

In 2007, Lee had the recurring role on the TBS sitcom Tyler Perry's House of Payne and shot an independent film called This Is Not a Test. From 2013 to 2014, she played Avery Daniels in the first season of the critically acclaimed BET drama series, Being Mary Jane. From 2017 to 2018, she starred in the Syfy horror drama series, Superstition.

Lee played Ros Bailey in Fifty Shades Darker (2017) and Fifty Shades Freed (2018), the sequels to Fifty Shades of Grey.

Lee's debut novel The Idea Of You was published on 13 June 2017 by St. Martin's Press. The story follows Solène Marchand, a 40-year-old mother and owner of a prestigious art gallery in Los Angeles, who falls for a considerably younger British popstar, idolized  by her 12-year-old daughter. The audiobook, read by Lee herself, was released on 3 April 2018 by Tantor Media. A film adaptation by Jennifer Westfeldt was announced in June 2021 and entered production in 2022 starring Anne Hathaway.

Filmography

Film/Movie

Television

References

External links
 
 

1974 births
American people of Chinese descent
American people of Jamaican descent
American film actresses
Columbia Law School alumni
Living people
Writers from Mount Vernon, New York
Actors from Mount Vernon, New York
Yale University alumni
21st-century American women